The 2018 Women's Cricket Super League, or 2018 Kia Super League for sponsorship reasons, was the third season of the Women's Cricket Super League (WCSL), the semi-professional women's cricket competition in England and Wales. The competition, run by the England and Wales Cricket Board (ECB), consisted of six franchise teams playing in a Twenty20 format. Western Storm were the defending champions.

Surrey Stars won the competition, defeating Loughborough Lightning by 66 runs in the final. Smriti Mandhana, an Indian player for Western Storm, was named player of the tournament, after she finished as the tournament's top run-scorer.

Competition format
Six teams competed for the T20 title which took place between 22 July and 27 August 2018. The six teams played each other twice in a round robin format, with the top three teams progressing to a Finals Day at the County Ground, Hove.

Teams

Last updated: 17 July 2018

Points Table

 The three top ranked teams qualified for the Knockouts.
  advanced to Final
  advanced to the Semi-final

Fixtures

League stage

Last updated: 18 August 2018

Semi-final

Final

Statistics
 Highest score by a team: Western Storm – 185/4 (20 overs) v Lancashire Thunder (9 August).
 Lowest score by a team: Surrey Stars – 66 (16.4 overs) v Yorkshire Diamonds (12 August).
 Top score by an individual: Lizelle Lee – 104 (58) v Loughborough Lightning (27 August).
 Best bowling figures by an individual: Katherine Brunt – 5/26 (4 overs) v Southern Vipers (2 August).

Most runs

Source: ESPNCricinfo

Most wickets

Source: ESPNCricinfo

References

External links
 Tournament homepage at ESPNcricinfo
 Tournament homepage at CricBuzz

2018
2018 in English women's cricket